Zenkichi is a masculine Japanese given name.

Possible writings
Zenkichi can be written using different combinations of kanji characters. Here are some examples:

善吉, "virtuous, good luck"
全吉 "all, good luck"
然吉, "so, good luck"

The name can also be written in hiragana ぜんきち or katakana ゼンキチ.

Notable people with the name
, Japanese politician

Fictional characters
Zenkichi Hitoyoshi (人吉 善吉), protagonist of the manga series Medaka Box

Japanese masculine given names